Kunchacko (19 February 1912 – 15 June 1976) was an Indian film producer and director who worked in the Malayalam film industry. His venture Udaya Studios influenced the gradual shift of Malayalam film industry from its original base of Madras, Tamil Nadu to Kerala. He is the producer of Jeevithanauka (1951), starring Thikkurissy Sukumaran Nair.

Career
In 1947, he established Udaya Studio in Pathirappally, Alappuzha. In his early days, Kunchacko produced films under the banner of K & K Productions, with the partnership of K. V. Koshy. The company produced 4 films: Vellinakshatram, Nalla Thanka, Jeevithanauka and Visappinte Vili. Jeevithanauka (1951), starring Thikkurissy Sukumaran Nair ran for 250 days. During the making of the film Achchan, Kunchacko and Koshy parted ways and each started film-making under separate banners: Kunchacko under Udaya and Koshi under Filmco. Kunchacko went on to produce Achchan, Avan Varunnu and Kidappadam under the banner of Udaya. Kidappadam was a commercial failure, and that caused Kunchacko to close down Udaya Studio. However, Udaya was opened within a few years with the help of his friend and Kerala state minister T. V. Thomas.

In 1960, Kunchacko tried his hand in film direction with Umma, which he followed with Neeli Saali and Seetha. He went on to direct 40 films in his career of many genres including purana stories, vadakkan pattu stories, comedy films and social themed films. Some of his films are Bharya, Unniyarcha, Palattukoman, Sakunthala, Pazhassiraja, Mainatheruvi Kolacase, Ponnapuram Kotta, Anarkali and Kannappanunni. His career in film direction went along with his career as film producer. He produced films directed by various directors such as M. Krishnan Nair (Agni Mrigam, Thara, Kattuthulasi), A. Vincent (Gandharva Kshethram), Thoppil Bhasi (Oru Sundariyude Katha, Ningalenne Communistakki), K.S. Sethumadhavan (Koottukudumbam) and K. Raghunath (Laura Neeyevide).In 1976, Kunchacko died in Madras, Tamil Nadu with musician K. Raghavan for the song recording of the film Mallanum Mathevanum. Kannappanunni was the last film directed by him. His death occurred on the fifth death anniversary (15 June) of the veteran Malayalam actor Sathyan, who acted in many of his films. Kunchako's Udaya Studios faced heavy losses later, and stopped production.

Family
His grandson, Kunchacko Boban is also a Malayalam film actor.

Filmography

Direction
Kannappanunni (1977)
Chennai Valarthiya Kutty (1976)
Mailanum Mathevanum (1976)
Cheenavala (1975)
Dharmakshetre Kurukshetre (1975)
Manishada (1975)
Neela Ponman (1975)
Durga (1974)
Thumbolarcha (1974)
Pavangal Pennungal (1973)
Ponnapuram Kotta (1973)
Thenaruvi (1973)
Aromalunni (1972)
Postmane Kananilla (1972)
Panchavan Kadu (1971)
Dattuputhran (1970)
Othenente Makan (1970)
Pearl View (1970)
Susie (1969)
Kodungalluramma (1968)
Punnapra Vyalar (1968)
Thirichadi (1968)
Kasavuthattam (1967)
Mainatharuvi Kola Case (1967)
Anarkali (1966)
Jail (1966)
Tilottama (1966)
Inapravugal (1965)
Shakuntala (1965)
Ayesha (1964)
Pazhassi Raja (1964)
Kadalamma (1963)
Rebecca (1963)
Bharya (1962)
Palattukoman (1962)
Krishna Kuchela (1961/I)
Unniyarcha (1961)
Neeli Sally (1960)
Seeta (1960)
Umma (1960)

References

External links

Malayalam film directors
People from Alappuzha district
1976 deaths
1912 births
Kerala State Film Award winners
Malayalam film producers
Film directors from Kerala
20th-century Indian film directors
Film producers from Kerala